Liseh Rud-e Tazehabad (also Romanized as Līseh Rūd-e Tāzehābād) is a village in Otaqvar Rural District, Otaqvar District, Langarud County, Gilan Province, Iran. At the 2006 census, its population was 400, in 106 families.

References 

Populated places in Langarud County